The European Dance Radio Chart (also known as European Dance Radio Top 25) was a weekly chart compiled by pan-European magazine Music & Media. After dance music had played a more dominant role on the magazine's Eurochart Hot 100 in the beginning of the 1990s, the new chart was launched on 28 September 1991. Based on a weighted-scoring system, it was compiled on the basis of playlists of European stations programming various styles of dance music, including hip hop/rap, R&B and swingbeat, for the 15-30 year-olds, fulltime or during specific dayparts. The first number one single on the EDR Chart was "Gett Off" by Prince.

Number one singles on European Dance Radio Top 25

1991
Prince - "Gett Off" (28 September 1991)
P.M. Dawn - "Set Adrift on Memory Bliss" (19 October 1991)
Simply Red - "Something Got Me Started" (2 November 1991)
Lisa Stansfield - "Change" (23 November 1991)
Michael Jackson - "Black or White" (21 December 1991)

1992
DNA - "Can You Handle It" (15 February 1992)
Shanice - "I Love Your Smile" (29 February 1992)
Soul II Soul - "Joy" (11 April 1992)
Swing Out Sister - "Am I the Same Girl" (23 May 1992)
Kris Kross - "Jump" (4 July 1992) 
Snap! - "Rhythm Is a Dancer" (18 July 1992)
Joe Public - "Live and Learn" (1 August 1992)
Bobby Brown - "Humpin' Around" (5 September 1992)
Prince - "My Name Is Prince" (7 November 1992)
Madonna - "Erotica" (21 November 1992)
Arrested Development - "People Everyday" (12 December 1992)
Whitney Houston - "I Will Always Love You" (19 December 1992)

1993
Arrested Development - "Mr. Wendal" (13 February 1993)
U.S.U.R.A. - "Open Your Mind" (27 February 1993)
2 Unlimited - "No Limit" (13 March 1993)
Naughty by Nature - "Hip Hop Hooray" (3 April 1993)
Whitney Houston - "I'm Every Woman" (10 April 1993)
Robin S. - "Show Me Love" (1 May 1993)
Jade - "Don't Walk Away" (15 May 1993)
Janet Jackson - "That's the Way Love Goes" (5 June 1993)
2 Unlimited - "Tribal Dance" (12 June 1993)
Chaka Demus & Pliers - "Tease Me" (24 July 1993)
M People - "One Night in Heaven" (7 August 1993)
Shara Nelson - "Down That Road" (11 September 1993)
Robin S. - "Luv 4 Luv" (18 September 1993)
Mariah Carey - "Dreamlover" (25 September 1993)
De La Soul - "Breakadawn" (13 November 1993)
Culture Beat - "Got to Get It" (20 November 1993)

1994
Urban Cookie Collective - "Feels Like Heaven" (8 January 1994)
2 Unlimited - "Maximum Overdrive" (29 January 1994)
2 Unlimited - "Let the Beat Control Your Body" (12 February 1994)
Culture Beat - "Anything" (26 March 1994)
Cappella - "Move on Baby" (23 April 1994)
Des'ree - "You Gotta Be" (30 April 1994)
CB Milton - "It's a Loving Thing" (7 May 1994)
Crystal Waters - "100% Pure Love" (14 May 1994)
Cappella - "U & Me" (23 July 1994)
Jam & Spoon - "Find Me (Odyssey to Anyoona)" (27 August 1994)
La Bouche - "Sweet Dreams" (3 September 1994)
Whigfield - "Saturday Night" (29 October 1994)
Ice MC - "It's a Rainy Day" (12 November 1994)

1995
Corona - "Baby Baby" (15 April 1995)
Corona - "Try Me Out" (1995)

See also
Music & Media on World Radio History

References

European music
European music charts